Lady Jane is a 2008 French film directed by Robert Guédiguian, starring Ariane Ascaride, Jean-Pierre Darroussin and Gérard Meylan.

Cast
 Ariane Ascaride as Muriel
 Jean-Pierre Darroussin as François
 Gérard Meylan as René
 Yann Trégouët as Young Man
 Frédérique Bonnal as Charlotte
 Pascale Roberts as Solange
 Jacques Boudet as Henri
 Pascal Cervo as Lieutenant
 Giuseppe Selimo as Martin
 Anna Ostby as Marly

References

External links 
 

2008 films
2000s French-language films
2008 crime drama films
French crime drama films
Films directed by Robert Guédiguian
2000s French films